Leistikow is a surname. Notable people with the surname include:

Gertrud Leistikow (1885–1948), German dancer and choreographer
Hans Leistikow (1895–1967), German general during the Second World War
Logan Leistikow (born 1984), American filmmaker
Walter Leistikow (1865–1908), German artist, painter, etcher and writer